Filippovo is a rural locality (a village) in Terebayevskoye Rural Settlement, Nikolsky District, Vologda Oblast, Russia. The population was 30 as of 2002.

Geography 
Filippovo is located 24 km north of Nikolsk (the district's administrative centre) by road. Kuznetsovo is the nearest rural locality.

References 

Rural localities in Nikolsky District, Vologda Oblast